Berardino is a surname. Notable people with the surname include:

Dick Berardino (born 1937), American baseball player and coach
Joseph Berardino (born 1950), American businessman
 Riccardo Berardino, (born 1990), Italian footballer
William Berardino, Canadian lawyer